Pierre Poivre (23 August 1719 – 6 January 1786) was an 18th-century horticulturist and botanist. He was born in Lyon, France.

He was a missionary to East Asia, intendant of French colonial islands in the Indian Ocean, and wearer of the cordon of St. Michel.

Career
In his early 20s (ca. 1739), Poivre was a missionary in Far Eastern locations that included Cochinchina, Guangzhou, and Portuguese Macau. In 1745 as a member of the French East India Company, while on a journey to the East Indies, he was struck by a cannonball on the wrist while engaged in a naval battle with the British. The injury required the amputation of part of his right arm.

Botanical garden
In the 1760s, Poivre became administrator intendant of Isle de France (in present-day Mauritius) and Ile Bourbon (in present-day Réunion) in the West Indian Ocean. On northern Isle de France — Mauritius - he is renowned for the establishment of a new botanical garden, the present day Sir Seewoosagur Ramgoolam Botanical Garden (Botanical Garden of Pamplemousses), with specimens of trees, shrubs and plants imported from tropical habitats worldwide. He was succeeded as its director by the botanist Jean-Nicolas Céré. Today on northern Mauritius, the SSR Botanical Garden−Botanical Garden of Pamplemousses still flourishes and is now a  garden containing tropical plants and trees from other islands in the Indian Ocean, Africa, Asia, the Americas and Oceania.

Spice trade
Poivre is also remembered for introducing spice plants to Mauritius and Reunion, such as clove and nutmeg, commodities which at the time were controlled by the Dutch who had a virtual monopoly on them in the Dutch East Indies. In order to obtain the spices, Poivre arranged clandestine smuggling forays to obtain plants and seeds from the Dutch Spice Islands in 1769–1770. Poivre was also responsible for introducing spice plants to the Seychelles.

Publications
 Voyages of a Philosopher − Voyages d'un philosophe ou observations sur les moeurs et les arts des peuples de l'Afrique, de l'Asie et de l'Amérique — Fortuné-Barthélemy de Félice, 1769. The book was read with interest by Thomas Jefferson, his description of mountain rice cultivated in Vietnam caught Jefferson's attention.
 Tableau historique de l'Inde, contenant un abrégé de la mithologie et des mœurs indiennes —  Aux dépens de la Société typographique, 1771.

Taxonomy

Family 
Pierre Poivre married Françoise Robin (1749 - 1841) on 5 September 1766 in Pommiers, Rhône. They had three children:
 Marie Poivre (1768 - 1787)
 Françoise Julienne Ile-de-France Poivre (1770 - 1845), married Jean-Xavier Bureau de Pusy (1750 - 1806)
 Sarah Poivre (1773 - 1814)

He was an uncle to the renowned French naturalist Pierre Sonnerat (1748-1814).

Honors
The Poivre Islands coral atoll is named in his honor. It is located in the Amirante Islands group of coral islands and atolls that belong to the Outer Islands of the Seychelles.

Pierre's surname means "pepper" (Poivre;) in French, leading some authors to identify him as the subject of the Peter Piper rhyme.

References

External links

 
 Photographs of the Sir Seewoosagur Ramgoolam Botanical Garden—Botanical Garden of Pamplemousses, Travel Mauritius
 "Mauritius Heritage in Pamplemousses Gardens", Gaia Discovery

French horticulturists
French taxonomists
1719 births
1786 deaths
Botanists active in Africa
Botanists active in Asia
Botanists active in China
Mauritian scientists
Scientists from Lyon
18th-century French botanists
Missionary botanists